Sabana-Camagüey is an archipelago that lies on Cuba's north-central Atlantic coast. It is located off the northern coast of the provinces of Matanzas, Villa Clara, Sancti Spíritus, Ciego de Ávila and Camagüey, and is bounded to the north by the Atlantic Ocean, specifically by the Nicholas Channel (Sabana  segment) and Old Bahama Channel (Camagüey segment).

The eastern islands are grouped in the Jardines del Rey archipelago, and contains Cayo Coco, Cayo Guillermo and Cayo Romano among others.

Conservation
The coastal and marine ecosystem represented by the archipelago is undergoing conservation projects supported by the Global Environment Facility and Environment Canada. Mangroves and coastal forests effectively create a buffer zone between the agricultural coast and the sensitive marine environment. The Sabana-Camagüey ecosystem encompasses the Bay of Buena Vista Biosphere Reserve, the Caguanes National Park, as well as wetlands of northern Ciego de Ávila Province. A total of 35 protected sites are located here.

List of cays

Sabana section

Cayo Piedras
Cayo Cruz del Padre
Cayo Blanco
Cayo Cinco Leguas
Cayo Ingles
Cayo Falcones
Cayo Megano
Cayo Blanquizal
Cayo Sotaviento
Cayo Verde
Cayo Hicacal
Cayo La Vela
Cayos de Pajonal
Cayo Fragoso

Camagüey section

Cayo Frances
Cayo Santa Maria
Cayo Caiman Grande
Jardines del Rey
Cayo Guillermo
Cayo Coco
Cayo Judas
Cayo Romano
Cayo Paredon Grande
Cayo Megano Grande
Cayo Eusebio
Cayo Cruz
Cayo Guajaba
Cayo Sabinal
Cayo Confites

See also
Geography of Cuba

References

Islands of Cuba
Archipelagoes of the Atlantic Ocean
Geography of Camagüey Province
Geography of Ciego de Ávila Province
Geography of Matanzas Province
Geography of Sancti Spíritus Province
Geography of Villa Clara Province